Boye is a Danish surname. Notable people with the surname include: 

Anker Boye (born 1950), Danish politician
Erik Boye (born 1964), Danish footballer
Jan Boye (born 1962), Danish politician
John Boye (born 1987), Ghanaian footballer
Hans Jørgen Boye (born 1942), Danish Olympic rower
Karin Boye (1900–1941), Swedish poet and novelist
Martin Hans Boyè (1812–1907), Danish-American chemist
Mame Madior Boye (born 1940), former Prime Minister of Senegal
Torben Boye (born 1966), Danish former professional footballer

Danish-language surnames